The Battle of Paso de Mercedes was fought on 11 August 1865 during the Paraguayan invasion of the Argentine province of Corrientes.

The battle took place at Bella Vista along the Paraná River, west of Mercedes.

History

Following the Battle of Riachuelo, José María Bruguez, Paraguayan commander, moved his men and Major Aquino's batteries to Punta Mercedes, about 15 miles north of Stonehouse ( Corrientes), to kilometer 1157 of the Paraná River. in attempt to cut the fleet from their supply base downstream.   He chose this position on 15 meter cliffs, as it afforded the guns a good angle on the passing fleet, from which he fired canister and grapeshot.

The Brazilian Navy fleet consisted of the Amazonas frigate (flagship), Apa, 6 gunboats: Ipiranga, Beberibe, Mearim, Araguary, Ivahy and Iguatemy; corvettes: Parnahyba, Belmonte, Maje, and Itajaí. Once past the gauntlet, Barroso continued another 9.6 km downstream, where he stopped for the night.  Bruguez meanwhile, backed up batteries and headed once again down river to Punta Cuevas, 25 km south of the town of Bella Vista, where he repeated his action against the fleet in the Battle of Paso de Cuevas.

References

Further reading

Theotonio Meirelles Da Silva, Historia Naval Brazileira, BiblioBazaar, LLC, 2008.
Mendonça, Mário F. e Vasconcelos, Alberto, Repositório de Nomes dos Navios da Esquadra Brasileira, Río de Janeiro, 1959
Andréa, Júlio, A Marinha Brasileira: florões de glórias e de epopéias memoráveis, Río de Janeiro, SDGM, 1955.

External links
Sitio oficial de la Armada de la República Argentina (ARA).
Historia y Arqueología Marítima
Maniobras y términos navales
Corveta Beberibe en naviosbrasileiros.com.br
Corbeta Beberibé en histarmar.com.ar
Sitio oficial de la Armada del Brasil, en portugués
La Artillería Paraguaya en la Guerra contra la Triple Alianza.

Conflicts in 1865
Battles involving Paraguay
August 1865 events
1865 in Argentina
Naval battles of the Paraguayan War
History of Corrientes Province